The fifth annual Nickelodeon Australian Kids' Choice Awards were held on 10 October 2007 at the Sydney Entertainment Centre. The show was hosted by The Veronicas and Zac Efron. Voting for the nominees of the awards commenced on 1 July 2007 and ended on 22 July 2007 and on 1 August 2007 the full list of nominees were announced with new category Biggest Greenie (who is the person kids think is doing most to save the planet). On 14 August 2007 the voting commenced. Torrie Wilson and Bobby Lashley were also scheduled to appear.

Guests
 The Veronicas - Co-Hosts
 Zac Efron - Co-Host
 Torrie Wilson
 Bobby Lashley

Performers
 Good Charlotte
 Dean Geyer
 Ricki-Lee
 Shannon Noll
 The Veronicas

Nominees & Winners
Winners in Bold.

Music

Fave Female Singer
 Ricki-Lee
 Amy Pearson
 Kate Miller-Heidke
 Missy Higgins

Fave Male Singer
 Shannon Noll
 Dean Geyer
 Anthony Callea
 Guy Sebastian

Fave Band
 The Veronicas
 Operator Please
 Rogue Traders
 Sneaky Sound System

Fave International Singer
 Pink
 Hilary Duff
 Justin Timberlake
 Mika

Fave International Band
 Good Charlotte
 Hinder
 Maroon 5
 Panic! at the Disco

Fave Song
 Fall Out Boy — Thnks Fr Th Mmrs
 Avril Lavigne — Girlfriend
 Naked Brothers Band — Crazy Car
 Rihanna — Umbrella

TV

Fave Nick Show
 Drake & Josh
 Camp Orange
 Unfabulous
 Zoey 101

Fave Toon
 SpongeBob SquarePants
 The Simpsons
 Avatar: The Last Airbender
 Ben 10

Fave TV Show
 Australian Idol
 Australia's Funniest Home Videos
 Big Brother
 Home and Away

Fave Female TV Star
 Bree Amer
 Caitlin Stasey
 Indiana Evans
 Sophie Luck

Fave Male TV Star
 Rove McManus
 Adam Hills
 Bobby Morley
 Mike Goldman

PEOPLE

Fave Hottie
 Dean Geyer
 Jennifer Hawkins
 Lucas Neill
 Natalie Bassingthwaighte

Fave Celebrity Duo
 Hamish & Andy
 James Mathison & Andrew G
 Maude & Kyle
 The Veronicas

MOVIES

Fave Movie
 Shrek 3
 Happy Feet
 Nancy Drew
 Night at the Museum

Fave Movie Star
 Zac Efron
 Emma Roberts
 Nicole Kidman
 Shia LaBeouf

THE BIG 3

So Hot Right Now
 High School Musical 2
 Naked Brothers Band
 Silverchair & Powderfinger
 WWE Raw

Biggest Greenie
 Bindi Irwin
 Ian Thorpe
 John Butler
 Peter Garrett

Fave Aussie
 Bindi Irwin
 Hugh Jackman
 Kate Ritchie
 Rove McManus

References

Nickelodeon Kids' Choice Awards
2007 awards
2007 in Australian television
2000s in Sydney